The Central Air Command is one of the five operational commands of the Pakistan Air Force and is based at PAF Base Mushaf in Sargodha, Punjab, Pakistan.

CAC is commanded by a senior PAF officer known as the "Air Officer Commanding" or "AOC", who is of Air Vice Marshal rank.

See also
Northern Air Command (NAC), Peshawar
Southern Air Command (SAC), Karachi
Air Defence Command (ADC), Rawalpindi
Air Force Strategic Command (AFSC), Islamabad
List of Pakistan Air Force Bases
List of active Pakistan Air Force aircraft

Published sources

 Pakistan Air Force, The Story of the Pakistan Air Force 1988-1998: A Battle Against Odds, Islamabad: Shaheen Foundation, 2000  
 Pakistan Air Force, The Story of the Pakistan Air Force: A Saga of Courage and Honour, Islamabad: Shaheen Foundation, 1988 
 Warnes, Alan, The Pakistan Air Force 1998-2008: A New Dawn, 2009

References

Pakistan Air Force
Air Force units and formations of Pakistan